John Godfrey Saxe II (June 25, 1877 – April 17, 1953) of Manhattan was a lawyer and a member of the New York State Senate. He was a delegate to the New York State Constitutional Convention representing New York's 16th congressional district in 1915. He was president of the New York State Bar Association, and counsel for Columbia University.

Biography
He was born on June 25, 1877 in Saratoga, New York to John Theodore Saxe and Mary Bosworth. He was the grandson of John Godfrey Saxe. He married Mary Sands on June 10, 1909. He died on April 17, 1953.

In the November 8, 1910 New York State Senate election, in the 17th State Senate district that was Republican by a great majority, John Saxe defeated incumbent Senator George B. Agnew who had been the sponsor of the Hart–Agnew Law that would lead to the complete shutdown of Thoroughbred racing in New York State.

References

1877 births
1953 deaths
Democratic Party New York (state) state senators
People from Saratoga, New York
Democratic Party members of the New York State Assembly
McGill University alumni
Columbia Law School alumni
Burials at Albany Rural Cemetery